Sugimotoa parallela is a species of beetle in the family Carabidae, the only species in the genus Sugimotoa.

References

Lebiinae